Parque Valle del Sol is a residential and golf community located in Santa Ana, Costa Rica.

References

External links

Populated places in San José Province